Rothemund is a surname. Notable persons with that surname include:
 Marc Rothemund (born 1968), German film director
 Paul W. K. Rothemund (born late 20th century), American scientist
 Paul Rothemund (chemist, born 1904), American chemist
 Sigi Rothemund (born 1944), German film director
 Yvonne Rothemund (born 1992), German ice hockey player